Stephanie Klinzing (born October 31, 1949) is an American journalist and politician.

Klinzing lives in Elk River, Sherburne County, Minnesota. She went to University of Wisconsin–Superior. Kinzing was a journalist and worked for the Osseo Maple Grove Press, Crow River News, and Elk River Star News newspaper. Klinzing served in the Minnesota House of Representatives in 1993 and 1994 and was a Democrat. She also served as mayor of Elk River and on the Sherburne County Board of Commissioners. Klinzing also serves on the Minnesota Board on Aging, Minnesota Housing Finance Agency Board of Directors, the Greater Minnesota Housing Fund Board of Directors, and the Adams/ECM Editorial Board.

Notes

1949 births
Living people
People from Elk River, Minnesota
University of Wisconsin–Superior alumni
Journalists from Minnesota
Women state legislators in Minnesota
County commissioners in Minnesota
Mayors of places in Minnesota
Democratic Party members of the Minnesota House of Representatives
21st-century American women